Kelbert Orlando Walters (born December 4, 1990) is an Anguillan cricketer and current member of the Leeward Islands cricket team.

Playing career
He made his debut for Anguilla at the 2006 Stanford 20/20 Tournament in Antigua and made his first appearance for the Leeward Islands in a first class game against Barbados on March 18, 2011. Walters is also a former member of the West Indies Under-19 cricket team.

References

Leeward Islands cricketers
Living people
1990 births
Anguillan cricketers